Finbarr Sheehan (born 1959) is an Irish retired hurler who played for club side Inniscarra. He played for the Cork senior hurling team for one seasons during which time he usually lined out as sub-goalkeeper to Ger Cunningham.

Honours

Inniscarra
Cork Junior Hurling Championship (1): 1975
Mid Cork Junior A Hurling Championship (1): 1975

Cork
National Hurling League (1): 1980-81
Munster Minor Hurling Championship (1): 1977

References

1959 births
Living people
Inniscarra hurlers
Muskerry hurlers
Cork inter-county hurlers
Hurling goalkeepers